A guarantee is a type of legal contract, stronger than a warranty or "security".

Guarantee may also refer to:

 Guarantee (international law), a promise by one state to protect the international obligations of another from third-party interference
 Guarantee (filmmaking), a promise of remuneration if a contracted person is released from a contract
 The Guarantee, a 2014 Irish film